Pryteria unifascia is a moth in the family Erebidae. It was described by Herbert Druce in 1899. It is found in Guyana and Belize.

Subspecies
Pryteria unifascia unifascia (Guyana)
Pryteria unifascia tenuis (Rothschild, 1935) (Belize)

References

Moths described in 1899
Phaegopterina